This is a list of secondary highways in Timiskaming District, most of which serve as logging roads or provide access to the isolated and sparsely populated areas in the Timiskaming District of northeastern Ontario.

Highway 558 

Secondary Highway 558, commonly referred to as Highway 558, is a secondary highway in the Canadian province of Ontario. Located in the Timiskaming District, the highway begins at the western city limits of Temiskaming Shores, three kilometres west of Highway 11 along Mowat Landing Road. Some cottages and a public boat launch are at the western terminus.

Highway 562 

Secondary Highway 562, commonly referred to as Highway 562, is a secondary highway in the Canadian province of Ontario. Located in the Timiskaming District, the highway begins at an intersection with Highway 65 at McCool.

Highway 564 

Highway 564 is a short secondary highway, which extends from Highway 112 near Tarzwell easterly for seven kilometres to the community of Boston Creek.

Highway 566 

Highway 566, a westerly continuation of the primary Highway 66, extends from the Montreal River at Matachewan for 25.9 kilometres to Ashley Mine.

Highway 567 

Secondary Highway 567, commonly referred to as Highway 567, is a secondary highway in the Canadian province of Ontario, located within Timiskaming District.

Highway 568 

Secondary Highway 568, commonly referred to as Highway 568, is a secondary highway the Unorganized West Part of Timiskaming District in northwestern Ontario, Canada.

Highway 569 

Secondary Highway 569, commonly referred to as Highway 569, is a secondary highway in the Canadian province of Ontario. Commencing at a junction with Highway 11 in the township of Harley, it travels northerly for  through the communities of Couttsville and Hilliardton, then travels west for  through the communities of Tomstown and Heaslip to another junction with Highway 11 and Highway 624 in the township of Evanturel southeast of Englehart.

Highway 570 

Secondary Highway 570, commonly referred to as Highway 570, is a secondary highway in the Canadian province of Ontario.

Highway 571 

Secondary Highway 571, commonly referred to as Highway 571, is a secondary highway in the Canadian province of Ontario.

Highway 573 

Secondary Highway 573, commonly referred to as Highway 573, is a secondary highway in the Canadian province of Ontario. Its northern terminus is Highway 11, and its southern terminus is at Highway 560 in Charlton.

Highway 624 

Secondary Highway 624, commonly referred to as Highway 624, is a secondary highway in the Canadian province of Ontario. Another Highway 624 existed in the mid-to-late 1950s west of Timmins, connecting Highway 616 with Foleyet; Highway 101 eventually assumed this route. The current Highway624 was assumed on September15, 1960.

Highway 640 

Secondary Highway 640, commonly referred to as Highway 640, was a secondary highway in the Canadian province of Ontario, which extended for three kilometres from a junction with Highway 571 in Earlton to the Earlton-Timiskaming Regional Airport. It was two lanes wide and paved in its entirety.

Highway 650 

Secondary Highway 650, commonly referred to as Highway 650, is a provincially maintained highway in the Canadian province of Ontario. The route was designated in 1964, shortly after the mine opened. It is sparsely travelled, but paved throughout its length.

References 

 
Roads in Timiskaming District